I Am the Man may refer to:

Film
I Am The Man (film), 1924 film with Flora Le Breton and Lionel Barrymore

Music
I Am the Man (album), by Simone White, 2007

Songs
"I Am The Man", single by The Philosopher Kings from Famous, Rich and Beautiful 1997
"I Am The Man", song by Neal Morse from One
"I Am The Man", single by Nicolay (musician) 2006
"I Am The Man", song by The Hitmen Australia 1979
"I Am The Man", song by The Rebels (surf band)